Stéphane Lemarchand (born 6 August 1971) is a French retired footballer who is last known to have played as a forward for Schiltigheim.

Career

Lemarchxnd started his career with French fourth division side . In 1994, Lemarchand signed for Caen in the French top flight, where he made 33 appearances and scored 6 goals. On 27 January 1995, he debuted for Caen during a 0–4 loss to Metz. On 23 February 2005, Lemarchand scored his first goal for Caen during a 4–0 win over Strasbourg. In 1996, he signed for French second division club Mulhouse. In 2000, Lemarchand signed for Carlisle in the English fourth division. After that, he signed for English third division team Rotherham. Before the second half of 2000–01, he signed for Schiltigheim in the French fifth division, helping them reach the quarter finals of the 2002–03 Coupe de France.

References

External links
 
 

French footballers
Expatriate footballers in England
Living people
Association football forwards
1971 births
Stade Malherbe Caen players
FC Mulhouse players
Louhans-Cuiseaux FC players
Carlisle United F.C. players